Amy Lasu Luaya Lasu (born 8 November 1995) is a South Sudanese footballer who plays as a midfielder for the South Sudan women's national team.

Early life
Lasu moved to Kenya in 1998, aged three.

International career
Lasu capped for South Sudan at senior level during the 2021 COSAFA Women's Championship.

Personal life
In 2018, Lasu earned a bachelor's degree in human resource management from Moi University.

References

1995 births
Living people
South Sudanese women's footballers
Women's association football midfielders
South Sudan women's international footballers
South Sudanese emigrants
Immigrants to Kenya
Moi University alumni